Pelkey Lake is a lake in Morrison County, in the U.S. state of Minnesota.

Pelkey Lake was named for an early settler.

See also
List of lakes in Minnesota

References

Lakes of Minnesota
Lakes of Morrison County, Minnesota